Makar Borisovich Yurchenko (born 29 July 1998) is a Russian-born Kazakh motorcycle racer. 

In 2014, 2016, 2017 and 2018 he competed in the FIM CEV Moto3 Junior World Championship. In 2014, 2015 and 2016 he was a Red Bull MotoGP Rookies Cup contestant. In  and  he raced in the Moto3 World Championship.

Career statistics

Grand Prix motorcycle racing

By season

Races by year
(key) (Races in bold indicate pole position; races in italics indicate fastest lap)

References

External links

1998 births
Living people
Kazakhstani motorcycle racers
Sportspeople from Saint Petersburg
Moto3 World Championship riders